The 2015 Spanish regional elections were held on Sunday, 24 May 2015, to elect the regional parliaments of thirteen of the seventeen autonomous communities—Aragon, Asturias, the Balearic Islands, the Canary Islands, Cantabria, Castile and León, Castilla–La Mancha, Extremadura, La Rioja, Madrid, Murcia, Navarre and the Valencian Community—, not including Andalusia, the Basque Country, Catalonia and Galicia, which had separate electoral cycles. 804 of 1,198 seats in the regional parliaments were up for election, as well as the 50 seats in the regional assemblies of Ceuta and Melilla. The elections were held simultaneously with local elections all throughout Spain.

The ruling People's Party (PP) suffered one of the harshest loss of votes for any party in the quadrennial regional elections, losing all of its absolute majorities and most of the regional administrations at stake, including notable PP strongholds such as the Valencian Community which it had held continuously since 1995. The Spanish Socialist Workers' Party (PSOE) was unable to capitalize on the PP backlash and kept losing votes from 2011. However, through post-election agreements with other left-wing parties it was able to recapture all of the regional governments it had lost four years previously, as well as gain the Valencian regional government.

The novelty of these elections was the irruption of two new parties: Podemos, a party founded in 2014 before the May European Parliament election, and Citizens (C's), a Catalan unionist party created in 2006 to run in Parliament of Catalonia elections. Podemos obtained a strong third place, close to the two main parties in several regions and entering in all regional parliaments—a first for any party aside from PP and PSOE—, while C's placed fourth in most regions, being left out from regional assemblies in the Canary Islands, Castilla–La Mancha and Navarre.

Election date
Determination of election day varied depending on the autonomous community, with each one having competency to establish its own regulations. Typically, thirteen out of the seventeen autonomous communities—all but Andalusia, the Basque Country, Catalonia and Galicia—had their elections fixed for the fourth Sunday of May every four years, to be held together with nationwide local elections.

In some cases, regional presidents had the prerogative to dissolve the regional parliament and call for extra elections at a different time, but newly elected assemblies were restricted to serving out what remained of their previous four year-terms without altering the period to their next ordinary election. In other cases—namely, Aragon, the Balearic Islands, Castile and León, Extremadura, Navarre and the Valencian Community—, the law granted presidents the power to call a snap election resulting in a fresh four year-parliamentary term. By the time of the 2015 regional elections, however, this prerogative had not yet been exercised by any of these communities.

Regional governments
The following table lists party control in autonomous communities and cities. Gains for a party are highlighted in that party's colour.

Overall results

Summary by region

Aragon

Asturias

Balearic Islands

Canary Islands

Cantabria

Castile and León

Castilla–La Mancha

Extremadura

La Rioja

Madrid

Murcia

Navarre

Valencian Community

Autonomous cities

Ceuta

Melilla

Notes

References

External links
www.juntaelectoralcentral.es (in Spanish). Central Electoral Commission – Regional elections
www.argos.gva.es (in Spanish). Argos Information Portal – Electoral Historical Archive
www.historiaelectoral.com (in Spanish and Catalan). Electoral History – Regional elections since 1980

2015
 
May 2015 events in Spain